Union of Communist Struggles (ULC) was a Communist party in the country now known as Burkina Faso. ULC was formed out of a split of the Voltaic Communist Organization (OCV). It was constituted on 14 October 1979. ULC promoted 'Popular and Democratic Revolution' (RDP).

In 1981 ULC dissolved. In 1983 it was reconstituted, and known as Union of Communist Struggles - Reconstructed (ULC-R).

The ULC published Prolétaire and Révolution Bolchévique.

Communist parties in Burkina Faso
Defunct political parties in Burkina Faso
Political parties established in 1979
Maoist organizations
Maoism in Africa